Stewart Wade is the screenwriter, producer and director of several independent short and feature films. Coffee Date was released in 2006, and deals with the intersection of the gay and straight worlds. Tru Loved was released in 2008, and deals with the founding of a school's first gay-straight alliance.

References

External links
Stewart Wade website

Living people
American film directors
American film producers
American male screenwriters
English-language film directors
Year of birth missing (living people)